Earnest is a technology-enabled fintech lender headquartered in San Francisco, California that offers education financing products, including student loan refinancing and private student loans. The company evaluates a person’s full education, employment, and financial profile, in addition to their credit score (also known as a FICO score) in order to obtain a complete financial profile of each applicant. This type of credit is referred to as "merit-based lending."

History 

Earnest was co-founded in 2013 by Louis Beryl, a former partner at Silicon Valley VC firm Andreessen Horowitz, and by Benjamin Hutchinson, who was Head of Commercial Finance at BBC and was a finance executive at the U.K.’s HM Treasury during the banking meltdown. Beryl got the idea for the company when he was attending Harvard to receive his M.B.A. and a degree in Public Policy. He needed a loan and was turned down despite his earning potential, having worked on Wall Street for a few years, and receiving a degree in financial engineering from Princeton University. He learned that traditional banks took a narrow view of loan applications and felt they were too hard and expensive for many Americans.

Earnest received $15M in seed funding from several VC firms, including Andreessen Horowitz, First Round Capital, Maveron, Collaborative Fund, and Atlas Venture in 2014. This funding was a combination of equity and lending capital. The company first launched a personal loan product in Boston, Massachusetts, as a test market, due to the high concentration of young professionals in the area. The company officially launched in March 2014. In 2014, Earnest distributed $8M in loans and by the end of the year had a growth rate of 70%.

On January 27, 2015, Earnest announced Series A equity funding of $17M led by Maveron. That same day, it also announced the launch of student loan refinancing for undergraduate and graduate students on both private and federal loans, with variable interest rates as low as 1.92% APR. On November 17, 2015, Earnest announced a $75M funding round led by Battery Ventures, plus $200M warehouse line of credit (since retired) from New York Life. The company said it would use the funds to assist in building out the company’s offering and expanding its workforce.

In 2016, Earnest was included on the Fast Company World’s 50 Most Innovative Companies list.

In August 2017, it was announced that Earnest would open a new office in Salt Lake City, Utah in its first major expansion.

In October 2017, Earnest announced it had agreed to be acquired by student loan servicer Navient Corp. for $155M. The acquisition allowed Earnest to be backed by a larger company with Navient planning to maintain the brand as a separate unit. In January 2018, Louis Beryl stepped down from his position as CEO. In July 2018, Navient hired Susan Ehrlich as the new CEO.

In April 2019, Earnest launched its private student loan product. 

In April 2021, Susan Ehrlich announced her retirement and stepped down as CEO to focus on board service.

On April 16, 2021, Earnest announced that David Green will be replacing Ehrlich as CEO. Green has held many roles at Earnest over a six-year tenure with the organization. Previously, Green was Head of Credit Operations, General Manager, Head of Student Loan Refinance, Chief Product Officer, and Chief Operating Officer.

Model 

Earnest provides private student loans and student loan refinancing to borrowers. The company does not focus solely on standard measures such as credit scores but takes a more individualized approach when evaluating borrowers by looking at their education, income potential, spending, and saving habits.

The company uses an online dashboard that gives clients tools to control and customize their loan payments by payment, amount, and time. As of April 2021, Earnest had refinanced $14.5 billion in student loan debt. As of June 2021, the company offers student loan refinancing in 48 states (all but Kentucky and Nevada) and the District of Columbia.

References

Financial technology companies
Companies based in San Francisco
American companies established in 2013
2017 mergers and acquisitions
Financial services companies based in California
Financial services companies established in 2013